Al Burj is a  tall commercial tower, located in Amman, Jordan. It was designated a historic building by the government of Jordan.

See also
 List of tallest buildings in Amman

References

Buildings and structures in Amman
Skyscrapers in Amman
Tourist attractions in Amman
Skyscraper office buildings
Office buildings completed in 1985